= Fermina Orduña =

Spanish inventor

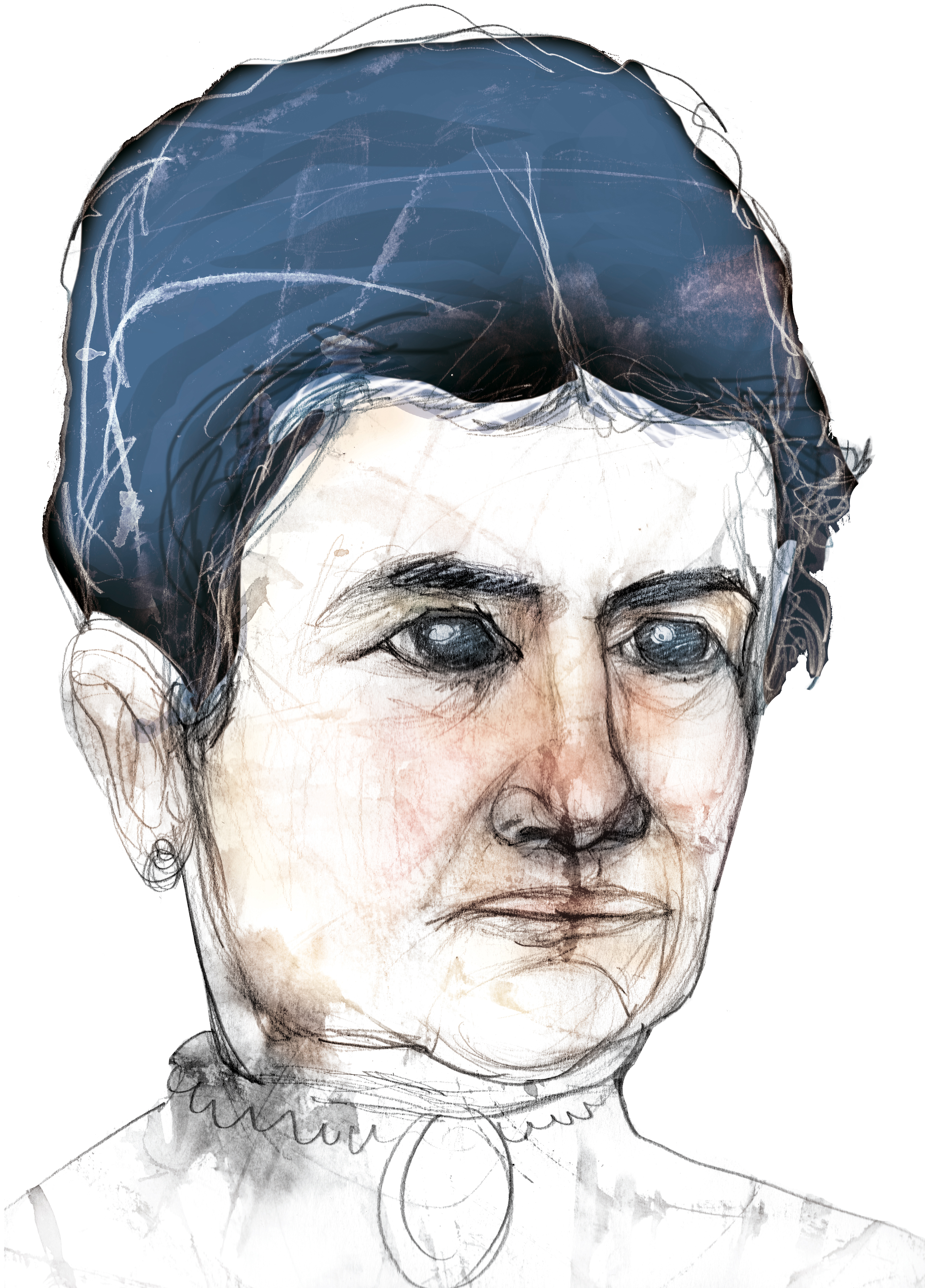
- Painting of Fermina Orduna by Eulogia Merle
- Citizenship: Spain
- Occupation: Inventor

Fermina Orduña was a Spanish inventor and first woman to achieve a technological privilege (patent) in Spain. She lived in the capital, Madrid.

== Patent ==
The patent described a special carriage to sell milk (cow, goat or donkey) to the public. Its purpose was to minimize transport time of milk due to keep it fresh. It additionally included feeding stations to keep the livestock fed and a hot water container to assist in milk storage. These allowed for fresh milk to be produced on sight. The patent protection had a period of 5 years from the date of issue on 20 May 1890.

== Legacy ==
The "Fermina Orduña" awards for technological innovation was created to reward those connected to Madrid who have significantly boosted scientific innovation.
